The Australia–New Zealand Closer Economic Relations Trade Agreement, commonly known as Closer Economic Relations (CER), is a free trade agreement between the governments of New Zealand and Australia. It came into force on 1 January 1983, but the actual treaty was not signed until 28 March 1983 by the Deputy Prime Minister of Australia and Minister for Trade, Lionel Bowen and the New Zealand High Commissioner to Australia, Laurie Francis in Canberra, Australia. This was because Malcom Fraser and Robert Muldoon hated each other personally to such an extent that they refused to ratify the agreement if the other was there.

Overview 

CER built on the earlier New Zealand Australia Free Trade Agreement (NAFTA), which was signed on 31 August 1965 and came into force on 1 January 1966. NAFTA had removed four-fifths of the tariffs between the two countries and quantitative restrictions on trade across the Tasman Sea. However, it came to be seen as too complex and bureaucratic, and in March 1980, a joint Prime Ministerial communiqué was released that called for "closer economic relations".

The two major sticking points in the negotiations were New Zealand's wish for better access for its dairy products in Australia and Australia's wish for New Zealand to remove export incentives and quantitative restrictions. After the two hurdles were overcome, the Heads of Agreement was signed on 14 December 1982 and came into force on 1 January of the following year.

One of the most important results of CER was the Protocol on the Acceleration of Free Trade in Goods, which resulted in the total elimination of tariffs or quantitative restrictions between the two countries by 1 July 1990, five years ahead of schedule.

Other parts of CER include:
A good that can be legally sold in one country can also be legally sold in the other. Anyone registered to practise an occupation in one country may practise in the other (with some exemptions including medical practitioners)
Service providers may provide services in either country (except in certain areas such as airway services)

The CER is complementary to the Trans-Tasman Travel Arrangement.

Future prospects

Continuing down the path of economic integration, the next step for the Australian and New Zealand governments is to create a customs union through a common external tariff and a common competition policy. New Zealand and Australia already have a common competition policy but are unlikely to have a common external tariff.

Addressing the New Zealand Parliament in February 2011, Australian Prime Minister Julia Gillard said:

There has been a call from within both the Australian and the New Zealand business communities to extend the CER to other Pacific Island nations, harmonising the CER and the Pacific Regional Trade Agreement (PARTA) so as to move toward a single market and allowing the free movement of people and goods.

There have also been calls from organisations such as CANZUK International to extend the CER and the Trans-Tasman Travel Arrangement to the United Kingdom and Canada, allowing free trade and free movement of people across four of the largest Commonwealth realms.

See also
 Australia–Chile Free Trade Agreement
 Australia–United States Free Trade Agreement
 Australia–United Kingdom Free Trade Agreement
 Comprehensive Economic Partnership for East Asia
 Foreign relations of Australia
 Foreign relations of New Zealand

References

Full text of Australian PM's address to the Parliament of NZ
Full text of New Zealand Australia Free Trade Agreement
Full text of Australia New Zealand Closer Economic Relations Trade Agreement.
A Celebration of Trans-Tasman Relations from the Australian Department of Foreign Affairs and Trade.
The Australia New Zealand Closer Economic Relations (CER) Trade Agreement:  1983 – 2003 Backgrounder from New Zealand Ministry of Foreign Affairs and Trade.
Closer Economic Relations (CER) from StudyOz (Australian High Commission in New Zealand).

Trade blocs
Economy of New Zealand
Economy of Australia
Free trade agreements of New Zealand
Free trade agreements of Australia
Treaties concluded in 1983
Treaties entered into force in 1983
Australia–New Zealand relations
1983 in Australia
1983 in New Zealand
1983 in New Zealand law